Love Is the Evidence is the first studio album by the Christian rock band Citizen Way, which was released on April 26, 2013, by Fair Trade Services, and the producers on the album were Seth Mosley and Citizen Way.

Reception

Critical

Love Is the Evidence has received almost universal acclaim from the music critics. Louder Than the Music's Dave Wood found the release to be "modern and relevant sounding, with stunning moments of brilliant inspiration", which "their pop approach to worship is refreshing and entertaining". At New Release Tuesday, Kevin Davis told that after hearing the album he was "stirred with compassion to love people as Jesus loves us." At Cross Rhythms, Tony Cummings touched on that it took nine years for the band to come into the spotlight, and now "their radio-friendly music will surely mean they stay in the spotlight ." At CCM Magazine, Grace S. Aspinwall noted how "listeners will gravitate towards the likeable pop sound that Citizen Way bring to the table", and this makes it a "strong and enjoyable album and promising debut from start to finish." Mark Rice of Jesus Freak Hideout alluded to how the release was "pretty good with greatness easily within its grasp." Christian Music Zine's Emily Kjonaas evoked that she "see[s] a lot of potential for this band of brothers." At Indie Vision Music, Jonathan Andre vowed that "while it does have its mishaps, issues and drama, is far from unfixable with a great amount of potential to improve upon in years to come!"

Commercial
On the May 11, 2013 charts, the album was the fourth most sold Billboard Top Heatseekers album. Plus, it was the No. 22 most sold Christian Album in the United States.

Track listing

Charts

References

2013 debut albums
Citizen Way albums
Fair Trade Services albums